Kim Shaw is an English snooker and pool player. She was runner-up in the 1995 World Women's Snooker Championship, and was the first player to compile a  break in a World Ladies Billiards and Snooker Association tournament.

Biography
Shaw started playing snooker in 1984, at a snooker club in High Wycombe. In the late 1980s, Shaw combined her playing career with working at Rileys Snooker Club, on the Oxford Road, Reading, Berkshire She reached the semi-finals of the World Women's Snooker Championship in 1986, losing 3–4 to Sue LeMaich. Shaw reached the quarterfinals of the world championship in both 1991 and 1994, before her best showing, in the 1995 tournament, which was held in India.

Her 1995 world championship run saw her defeat Maryann McConnell, Lynette Horsburgh and Tessa Davidson on her way to the semi-final, where she beat Allison Fisher, who had won the championship on each of the last three occasions that it had been run, by 5  to 3. In the final, Shaw lost the first three frames to Karen Corr and end up losing 6–3. This proved to be her only world snooker championship final, although she did reach the semi-finals in both 1998 and 1999.

In the 1997 EBSA European Snooker Championship, Shaw was runner up, losing 3–5 to Kelly Fisher. She won the 2000 Grand Prix tournament, which included victories over reigning world champion Kelly Fisher 3–2 in the quarter-final, and Emma Bonney 4–1 in the final. At this time, her main source of income was working as a courier for DHL.

Shaw was runner up in the 2000 Connie Gough Memorial, to losing 1–4 to Kelly Fisher. More recently, Shaw has played pool competitively, winning a number of tournaments. She once appeared on the television programme Surprise Surprise, playing against Tony Meo.

Titles and achievements
Snooker
1988 Billy Boy Foods Snooker Classic
1995 Regal Masters champion.
1997 EBSA European Snooker Championship runner-up
2000 Connie Gough Memorial – runner-up

Pool
Main source: azbilliards.com (See External Links below)

2001 WPBA Amateur National Champion 
2001 LBAF Tour #6 Champion
2001 AWBT #5 Champion 
2001 Pennsylvania State Ladies Nine-ball Championship runner-up
2002 JPNEWT #2 Champion
2002 JPNEWT 2002 #1 Champion 
2002 JPNEW New Jersey Eight-ball Championship runner-up
2003 Women N.C. Nine-ball Championship Runner-up
2003 JPNEW NY Nine-ball Championship Runner-up 
2003 Women Virginia State Championship Runner-up  
2004 JPNEW Tour 2004 #1 Champion
2004 C.A.T. 2004 Stop 2 Runner-up
2005 Ladies Florida State Champion
2006 WPBA US Open Runner-up
2006 Ladies Spirit Tour #2 Runner-up
2009 MAL Tour Stop 2 Champion
2009 CAL Pechauer Tour #3 Champion
2009 Kwikfire Tour #2 Runner-up
2009 Kwikfire Tour #3 Runner-up

References

External links
Kim Shaw at WPBSA Tournament Manager

Shaw plays Karen Corr (who beat her in the world snooker championship final) at pool

Female snooker players
English snooker players
Female pool players
English pool players
1969 births
Living people